

The Bede BD-7 was a light aircraft constructed in the United States in 1976.  It shared the Bede BD-5's pusher propeller configuration but was considerably larger.  The fuselage was all-metal, and the wings used the unique "panel-rib" wing construction pioneered on the Bede BD-4.  Some sources state that the prototype (registration N7BD) flew in December 1976, but most suggest that it was never actually completed, much less flown.

Specifications (prototype)

See also

References

 
 
 
 aerofiles.com
 BD News 1976

BD-007
1970s United States civil utility aircraft
Single-engined pusher aircraft
Low-wing aircraft
Homebuilt aircraft
Abandoned civil aircraft projects of the United States